Kiowa County USD 422 is a public unified school district headquartered in Greensburg, Kansas, United States.  The district includes the communities of Greensburg, Mullinville, Brenham, Joy, and nearby rural areas.

Schools
The school district operates the following schools:
 Kiowa County High School
 Kiowa County Junior High School
 Kiowa County Elementary School

History
In 2011 it absorbed the former Mullinville USD 424, which had dissolved.

See also
 Kansas State Department of Education
 Kansas State High School Activities Association
 List of high schools in Kansas
 List of unified school districts in Kansas

References

External links
 

School districts in Kansas
Kiowa County, Kansas